Conasprella ramalhoi is a species of sea snail, a marine gastropod mollusk in the family Conidae, the cone snails and their allies.

Description
The length of the shell varies between 18 mm and 40 mm.

Distribution
This marine species occurs off Mozambique and Eastern Africa.

References

External links
 Gastropods.com: Conasprella (Fusiconus) elegans ramalhoi

ramalhoi
Gastropods described in 1986